The Brooks–British Range tundra is an ecoregion spanning North America and Canada, and is one of the WWF Global 200 ecoregions.

Geography
The Brooks–British Range tundra extends east and west along the Brooks Range which runs across northern Alaska and northeastern Yukon Territory. The Brooks Range is divided into western and eastern sections by the Anaktuvuk Pass. The Western Brooks Range is relatively low, while the Eastern Brooks Range is higher and more rugged, with larger areas of permanent ice and snow. The southern slopes of the Brooks Range are drained by the Yukon River, which empties westwards into the Bering Sea. The north slope drains northward into the Arctic Ocean. 

The British Range extends southwards from the eastern end of the Brooks Range, forming the divide between the Yukon and Mackenzie river basins and the boundary between the Yukon and Northwest territories.

Protected areas
60.3% of the ecoregion is in protected areas. Protected areas include:
 Ivvavik National Park
 Vuntut National Park
 Gates of the Arctic National Park
 Arctic National Wildlife Refuge
 Gates of the Arctic Wilderness
 Noatak Wilderness
 Mollie Beattie Wilderness
 Central Arctic Management Area Wilderness Study Area
 Galbraith Lake Area of Critical Environmental Concern
 Poss Mountain Area of Critical Environmental Concern
 Snowden Mountain Area of Critical Environmental Concern
 Sukakpak Mountain Area of Critical Environmental Concern
 Toolik Lake Research Natural Area Area of Critical Environmental Concern
 West Fork Atigun River Area of Critical Environmental Concern
 Nigu-Iteriak Area of Critical Environmental Concern
 Nugget Creek Area of Critical Environmental Concern
 Western Arctic Caribou Insect Relief Area of Critical Environmental Concern
 Neruokpuk Lakes Conservation Area
 Firth-Mancha Research Natural Area
 Shublik Springs Research Natural Area
 Ivishak River Wild & Scenic River Corridor
 Sheenjek River Wild & Scenic River Corridor
 Wind River Wild & Scenic River Corridor

See also
List of ecoregions in Canada (WWF)
List of ecoregions in the United States (WWF)

References

Ecoregions of Alaska
Ecozones and ecoregions of Yukon
Ecozones and ecoregions of the Northwest Territories
Nearctic ecoregions
Tundra ecoregions